Stork is a 1971 Australian comedy film directed by Tim Burstall. Stork is based on the play The Coming of Stork by David Williamson. Bruce Spence and Jacki Weaver make their feature film debuts in Stork, being honoured at the 1972 Australian Film Institute Awards, where they shared the acting prize. Stork won the prize for best narrative feature and Tim Burstall won for best direction. Stork was one of the first ocker comedies. Stork was the first commercial success of the Australian cinema revival called the Australian New Wave.

Plot
Stork is a 6-foot 7 hypochondriac who dreams of revolution and works at General Motors Holden. He is sacked from his job after doing a strip tease at work and goes to live in a share house in Carlton with his friend Westy and two trendy young men, Tony and Clyde, who share the same girlfriend, Anna. Stork loses his virginity to Anna and falls in love with her.

Anna falls pregnant and Clyde decides to marry her. Stork interrupts the wedding.

Cast
Bruce Spence as Graham 'Stork' Wallace
Jacki Weaver as Anna
Graeme Blundell as Westy
Sean McEuan as Tony
Helmut Bakaitis as Clyde
Madeleine Orr as Stork's mother
Peter Green as clergyman
Peter Cummins as sculptor
Michael Duffield as judge
Alan Finney as tailor
Robin Copping as explorer
David Bilock Jnr as explorer
Larry Stevens as farmer
Nanette Good as farmer's wife
Kerry Dwyer as nun
Brendan Cassidy as gallery manager
Lynne Flanagan as matron
George Whaley as businessman
Jan Friedl as woman's libber
Dennis Miller as uni lecturer
Terry Norris as Anna's father
Max Gillies as Uncle Jack
The Captain Matchbox Whoopee Band

Production
The play The Coming of Stork had premiered in 1970 at La Mama Theatre, run by Betty Burstall. Her husband Tim Burstall saw the play and hired Williamson to adapt it, commenting that:
It had a kind of gaiety and brio. It was good-natured and it celebrated our own lives in a very straightforward way. It wasn't the precious or arty. It was Australian comedy of a pretty straightforward sort, but also of a pretty well-observed and accurate sort.
Most of the budget was raised privately; Burstall had obtained $7,000 from the Experimental Film and Television Fund to make a film called Filth which project manager Fred Schepisi allowed him to transfer over to Stork; $5,000 came from Bilcock and Copping, a company of Burstall's, with $21,000 from the sale of Burstall's Arthur Boyd paintings. Everyone was paid $200 a week. The film was shot in Melbourne in March and April 1971 on 16mm stock and a crew of twelve.

Williamson later said he felt Burstall directed Spence "a little bigger than I would have liked" and clashed in a few places with the director but on the whole the collaboration was a good one.

Release
Tim Burstall and his associates initially released the film themselves at St Kilda Palais, where it ran for a six-week season, earning $50,000 and returning $20,000 to the producers. They expanded the number of cinemas it played in, moving into Sydney. Hoyts and Greater Union refused to distribute but the film was picked up by Roadshow, who played it throughout Australia, using 35 mm prints blown up from the original. 
The film was popular at the box office, taking $224,000 in film hire and returning $150,000 to the producers. It proved that low-budget films could be made and released profitably in Australia. This success led to Burstall and Roadshow establishing the production company Hexagon Productions.

Awards
The film won the following awards:
1972 Australian Film Institute Awards:
AFI Award for Best Direction (Tim Burstall)
Grand Prix Award to Tim Burstall
Hoyts Prize for Best Performance for Best Actor (Bruce Spence)
Hoyts Prize for Best Performance for Best Actress (Jacki Weaver)
$5,000 prize from Australian Film Development Corporation for best narrative feature

Home media
Stork was released on DVD by Umbrella Entertainment in September 2011. The DVD is compatible with region codes 2 and 4 and includes special features such as interviews with Tim Burstall, Alan Finney, Bruce Spence, David Williamson, Betty Burstall, Jacki Weaver and Rob Copping, a short film title Three Old Friends and the making of Three Old Friends.

References

External links

Stork at the Australian screen
Stork at Oz Movies

1971 films
1971 comedy films
Australian comedy films
Films based on works by David Williamson
Films set in Melbourne
1970s English-language films
Films directed by Tim Burstall